A relational database management system uses SQL conditions or expressions in  clauses and in  clauses to  subsets of data.

Types of condition 

 Many conditions compare values for (for example) equality, inequality or similarity.
 The EXISTS condition uses the SQL standard keyword EXISTS to determine whether rows exist in a subquery result.

Examples
To  one row of data from a table called tab with a primary key column (pk) set to 100 — use the condition pk = 100:
SELECT * FROM tab WHERE pk = 100

To identify whether a table tab has rows of data with a duplicated column dk — use the condition having count(*) > 1:
SELECT dk FROM tab GROUP BY dk HAVING count(*) > 1

References 

SQL
Articles with example SQL code